Abraham Eustis (March 26, 1786 – June 27, 1843) was a lawyer and notable U.S. Army officer, eventually rising to become a Brevet Brigadier General. He saw service in Florida and became a notable artillery specialist and the first commander of Fort Monroe, located at the entrance to the harbor of Hampton Roads in Virginia.

In Florida, Lake Eustis and the city of Eustis were each named in his honor. Camp Abraham Eustis, a World War I-era U.S. Army base along the James River, was named for him. Later renamed Fort Eustis and now located in the independent city of Newport News, Virginia, it is part of an expanded and active facility, Joint Base Langley-Eustis.

Biography
Eustis was born in Petersburg, Virginia. He was the son of Abraham Eustis (1757-1786) and Margaret (Parker) Eustis (1762-1841) and the nephew of William Eustis, who served as secretary of war from 1809 to 1812. Eustis earned the degrees of A.B. from Harvard College in 1804 and A.M. from Bowdoin College two years later. He joined the army in May 1808 and served during the War of 1812, the Black Hawk War (1832), and the Seminole Wars.

In 1830, Eustis became the first commander of Fort Monroe, which guards the entrance to Hampton Roads at Old Point Comfort in southeastern Virginia. There for many years, he commanded the school for Artillery Practice. In May 1838, Eustis took command of Fort Butler, one of the main military posts built for the forced removal of the Cherokee known as the Trail of Tears.  Nearly 5,000 Cherokee of North Carolina and Georgia were taken to Fort Butler, then to the main internment camp at Fort Cass. The troops stationed at Fort Butler were those of Eustis's command from the Second Seminole War in Florida.

He was the father of Brigadier General Henry L. Eustis. Eustis died at Portland, Maine, while in command of the 6th U.S. Military District, which was headquartered there at the time. He is buried in Mount Auburn Cemetery in Cambridge, Massachusetts.

Fort Eustis
Fort Eustis was originally known as Camp Abraham Eustis when it was established during World War I on historic Mulberry Island and an adjacent portion of the mainland along the James River in Warwick County, upstream from Newport News Shipbuilding and Drydock Company. It became Fort Eustis and a permanent Army base in 1923. Fort Eustis is now located within the corporate limits of the independent city of Newport News (which merged with the former Warwick County in 1958). An Army Aviation School is also located there. The James River Reserve Fleet of decommissioned vessels, known locally as the "Dead Fleet" is located in the river offshore. With the base closure of Fort Monroe in nearby Hampton, a portion of the work there has shifted to Fort Eustis.

Notes and references

 Duncan, Barbara R. and Riggs, Brett H. Cherokee Heritage Trails Guidebook. University of North Carolina Press: Chapel Hill (2003).

External links

 Fort Eustis official website
 Eustace Families Association website
 Fort Eustis history

1786 births
1843 deaths
United States Army officers
United States Army personnel of the War of 1812
Harvard College alumni
Bowdoin College alumni
People from Petersburg, Virginia
Burials at Mount Auburn Cemetery
American people of the Black Hawk War
American people of the Seminole Wars
Military personnel from Virginia